Purity Cherotich is the name of

 Purity Cherotich Kirui (born 1991), Kenyan steeplechase runner
 Purity Cherotich Rionoripo (born 1993), Kenyan long-distance runner